Michał Przysiężny (born 16 February 1984) is a former Polish professional tennis player. He reached the semifinals of St. Petersburg in 2013, achieving a career-high singles ranking of World No. 57 in January 2014.

Career

He started his career in the KKT Wrocław. In 2002 Przysiężny reached the semifinals of the boys' doubles at the French Open (partnered with Attila Balázs from Hungary). In the same year, he won his first Futures tournament in Montego Bay, Jamaica, defeating Jean-Julien Rojer in the final. He has reached ten finals of these tournaments, winning seven.

He qualified for his first Grand Slam tournament (2007 US Open) by beating his compatriot Łukasz Kubot. He lost in four sets to Michael Berrer in the first round.

Przysiężny made a return from a knee injury qualifying as a lucky loser in the 2008 Swedish Open; however, he lost to Jonas Björkman in the first round and winning Davis Cup matches.

At the end of 2009, his career gained momentum. He won three Futures tournaments in a row (Germany F19, Belarus F1, and Belarus F2) and rose 235 places to no. 427 in the ATP rankings. In November, he won the IPP Open, defeating Stéphane Bohli in the final from a set down. He finished the year as no. 183. Three months later, he won another Challenger tournament, where he eliminated Andrey Kuznetsov, Evgeny Kirillov, Goran Tošić, Tobias Kamke, and Julian Reister in the final). The week of March 29, he won matches against Caio Zampieri, Laurynas Grigelis, Charles-Antoine Brézac, Teymuraz Gabashvili, and Rubén Ramírez Hidalgo in the final of the Saint–Brieuc Challenger. Two weeks later, he lost to Santiago González in the final of the León Challenger. After this event, he was in the top 100 of the ATP rankings.

He got direct entry into a Grand Slam tournament for the first time in his career at the 2010 French Open. Przysiężny lost in straights sets in the first round to eventual quarterfinalist Mikhail Youzhny. He then entered the Wimbledon main draw for the first time, where he was met 17th seed Ivan Ljubičić. Przysiężny scored the biggest win of his career, defeating the Croatian in straight sets, subsequently losing in the second round to eventual quarterfinalist Yen-Hsun Lu. At the US Open, he faced 21st seed Albert Montañés, losing in five sets. Michał served for the match at 6–5 in the fourth set, squandering two match points.

At the 2013 St. Petersburg Open he defeated Albert Ramos, Fabio Fognini and Lukas Rosol to reach semifinals, where he lost to Ernests Gulbis. At Tokyo he defeated Marcel Granollers  in first round but lost in second round to Jarkko Nieminen. At the Paris Masters he defeated Jarkko Nieminen.

At the 2014 ATP 500 Tokyo singles tournament, he won over world number 12 Jo-Wilfried Tsonga, but lost in second round to Denis Istomin. In doubles he partnered with Pierre-Hugues Herbert, defeating the Bryan brothers, Jamie Murray / John Peers, Eric Butorac / Raven Klaasen and Ivan Dodig / Marcelo Melo to claim the title.

ATP career finals

Doubles: 1 (1 title)

ATP Challenger and ITF Futures finals

Singles: 28 (18–10)

Doubles: 13 (3–10)

Performance timeline

Singles

External links
 
 

1984 births
Living people
People from Głogów
Polish male tennis players
Sportspeople from Lower Silesian Voivodeship